Manaria atlantica is a species of sea snail, a marine gastropod mollusk in the family Eosiphonidae, the true whelk and their alliess.

Distribution
This marine species occurs off Guadeloupe.

Description
The size of the shell attains .

References

 Fraussen K. & Hadorn R. 2005. A new species of Eosipho (Gastropoda: Buccinidae) from Guadeloupe, Western Atlantic. Novapex 6 (4): 107–109.
 Fraussen, K. & Stahlschmidt, P. (2016). The extensive Indo-Pacific deep-water radiation of Manaria E.A. Smith, 1906 (Gastropoda: Buccinidae) and related genera, with descriptions of 21 new species. in: Héros, V. et al. (eds) Tropical Deep-Sea Benthos, volume 29. Mémoires du Muséum National d'Histoire Naturelle. 208: 363-456.

External links
 

Eosiphonidae
Gastropods described in 2005